Sinea diadema is a species of assassin bug family (Reduviidae), in the subfamily Harpactorinae. Sinea diadema is bivoltine, preys on small bugs and beetles, and overwinters in the egg stage.

Name 
In English the species goes by the common name  spined assassin bug. Its scientific name comes from Hebrew, where sinea means thorn bush or burning bush while diadema means crown.

Diet 
Cannibalism is not common in this species. However, when it occurs it usually involves a larger female eating a smaller male.

Reproduction 
Females can lay up to 412 eggs in laboratory conditions. Eggs are laid in clusters.

Occurrence 
It is native to North America and found in the Midwest in fields, often associated with goldenrod Solidago missouriensis Nuttall.  They are typically found in grasslands, gardens, as well as fields.

References

Reduviidae
Hemiptera of North America
Insects described in 1776
Taxa named by Johan Christian Fabricius